William Fulton (died 14 January 1941) was a Scottish footballer who played as a defender.

Career
Fulton played club football for Abercorn, a club of which he was a co-founder. He also made one appearance for Scotland in 1884.

He later worked as a newsagent in Paisley.

References

Year of birth missing
1941 deaths
Scottish footballers
Scotland international footballers
Abercorn F.C. players
Association football defenders
Place of birth missing
Place of death missing
19th-century births